David Jeffries Garrow (born May 11, 1953) is an American author and historian. He wrote the book Bearing the Cross: Martin Luther King, Jr., and the Southern Christian Leadership Conference (1986), which won the 1987 Pulitzer Prize for Biography. He also wrote Liberty and Sexuality (1994), a history of the legal struggles over abortion and reproductive rights in the U.S. prior to the 1973 Roe v. Wade decision, Rising Star: The Making of Barack Obama (2017), and other works.

Professional historians and scholars in other fields have criticized Garrow's later work on Martin Luther King. In 2019 Garrow wrote an article for the magazine Standpoint in which he wrote he had seen an FBI file with a handwritten note on it claiming King had witnessed, failed to prevent, and encouraged a sexual assault by another minister. Garrow said he found the claim credible. A number of scholars, including King specialists and COINTELPRO historians, described it as "deeply irresponsible" and excessively credulous in accepting the claim by an organization given a remit to destroy King and his reputation.

Life and career
Garrow was born in New Bedford, Massachusetts, the son of Barbara (Fassett) and Walter Garrow. He graduated magna cum laude from Wesleyan University in 1975 before receiving his Ph.D. from Duke University in 1981.

Garrow writes frequently on the history of the United States Supreme Court and the history of the Civil Rights Movement, and regularly contributes articles on these subjects to non-academic publications including The New York Times, The Nation, The Financial Times, and The New Republic.

Garrow served as a senior adviser for Eyes on the Prize, the award-winning PBS television history of the Civil Rights Movement covering the years 1954–1965. He has taught at Duke University (Instructor of History; 1978–1979), the University of North Carolina at Chapel Hill (Assistant Professor of History; 1980–1984), the City College of New York and the CUNY Graduate Center (Associate and full Professor of History; 1984–1991), The Cooper Union (Visiting Distinguished Professor of History; 1992–1993), the College of William and Mary (James Pinckney Harrison Visiting Professor of History; 1994–1995), American University (Distinguished Historian in Residence; 1995–1996) and the Emory University School of Law (Presidential Distinguished Professor; 1997–2005). From 2005 to 2011, Garrow was a senior research fellow at Homerton College, Cambridge. From 2011 until 2018, he served as Professor of Law and History and John E. Murray Faculty Scholar at the University of Pittsburgh School of Law.

In 1987, Garrow was a member of the Democratic Socialists of America.

In 2019, Garrow read FBI files that, according to Garrow, indicate that Martin Luther King Jr. may have encouraged and failed to prevent sexual violence. Garrow wrote that he was reassessing his view of King. Garrow wrote an article about King which he submitted to the Atlantic, the Washington Post, New York Times and The Guardian, all of which rejected it. The article was published in the now-defunct British conservative magazine Standpoint. 

Many authors called Garrow's claim unreliable. Garrow's reliance on a handwritten note addended to a typed report is considered poor scholarship by several authorities. Peter Ling of the University of Nottingham pointed out that Garrow was excessively credulous, if not naive, in accepting the accuracy of FBI reports during a period when the FBI was undertaking a massive operation to attempt to discredit King as part of its COINTELPRO activities. Garrow had earlier referred to Ling's work on King, widely considered authoritative, as "thoughtful, perceptive, and thoroughly well-informed". Experts in 20th-century American history, including Jeanne Theoharis, Barbara Ransby of the University of Illinois at Chicago, N. D. B. Connolly of Johns Hopkins University and Glenda Gilmore of Yale University have expressed reservations about Garrow's scholarship. Theoharis commented "Most scholars I know would penalize graduate students for doing this." It is not the first time the care and rigor of Garrow's work has been called into serious question. The long-time civil rights activist Edith Lee-Payne suggested Garrow may have published his work in the area to obtain "personal attention" for himself.

Selected works
 Protest at Selma (Yale University Press, 1978)
 The FBI and Martin Luther King, Jr. (Norton, 1981)
 Bearing the Cross: Martin Luther King, Jr., and the Southern Christian Leadership Conference (Morrow, 1986; HarperCollins paperback, 2004)
 We Shall Overcome (as editor, three volumes of an 18-volume set, Carlson Pub., 1989)
 Liberty and Sexuality: The Right to Privacy and the Making of Roe v. Wade (Macmillan, 1994; updated paperback edition, University of California Press, 1998)
 Rising Star: The Making of Barack Obama (2017)

References

External links
 
 David Garrow at the University of Pittsburgh
 with David Garrow  by Stephen McKiernan, Binghamton University Libraries Center for the Study of the 1960s, November 20, 2010

1953 births
American University faculty and staff
American biographers
City College of New York faculty
College of William & Mary faculty
Cooper Union faculty
Duke University alumni
Duke University faculty
Emory University faculty
Fellows of Homerton College, Cambridge
Graduate Center, CUNY faculty
Historians of African Americans
Living people
American male biographers
Members of the Democratic Socialists of America
People from New Bedford, Massachusetts
Pulitzer Prize for Biography or Autobiography winners
University of North Carolina at Chapel Hill faculty
University of Pittsburgh faculty
Wesleyan University alumni
Writers from Massachusetts
Historians of the civil rights movement